Stichonotus is a genus of ground beetles in the family Carabidae. There are at least four described species in Stichonotus.

Species
These four species belong to the genus Stichonotus:
 Stichonotus decoloratus Baehr, 2013  (Australia)
 Stichonotus leai Sloane, 1910  (Australia)
 Stichonotus limbatus Sloane, 1915  (Australia)
 Stichonotus piceus Sloane, 1915  (Australia)

References

Migadopinae